Carroll D. Osburn, an American scholar recognized as one of North America's leading New Testament textual critics and a prominent Christian egalitarian, is Carmichael-Walling Distinguished Professor Emeritus at Abilene Christian University, and former executive director, Caris Foundation. As an author, he has been collected primarily by libraries.

Education 

Osburn graduated from Harding University, where he was president of the senior class and received a BA in 1963, with majors in biology and Greek. He received the MTh in 1968 from Harding School of Theology. After graduating from Vanderbilt University in 1970 with the DDiv [now DMin] degree, he received his PhD in New Testament and early Byzantine Greek from the University of St. Andrews, Scotland, in 1974.

Academic career 

From 1973 to 1983, Osburn served as Professor of Greek and New Testament at Harding School of Theology.  To students primarily from Churches of Christ for whom the use of scripture was dogmatic proof-texting, Osburn emphasized literary and historical controls to biblical interpretation. Eugene Nida encouraged him to serve as translation consultant for Bible translators among pre-literate people. Utilizing discourse analysis, Osburn conducted numerous short-term, one book workshops for translators in Central and South America in the 1970s and 1980s.  He also developed sensitivity to humanitarian needs in the Developing World. Adding discourse analysis to literary and historical method led to Greek classes formerly of five or six numbering fifty or sixty. He became a popular speaker at seminars and retreats in the U.S. and around the world. In 1980, he was visiting professor at the University of St. Andrews, and in 1983, was named “Educator of the Year” by 20th Century Christian.

Osburn became Distinguished Professor of New Testament at Pepperdine University 1983–1987.   Urged by Kurt Åland, Matthew Black, and Bruce Metzger, he concentrated attention on ancient manuscripts underlying the Greek New Testament, and chaired the New Testament Textual Criticism Section of the Society of Biblical Literature 1984–90.

In 1987, Osburn was invited to Abilene Christian University, where he was Carmichel-Walling Distinguished Professor of New Testament Language and Literature until 2004.  He was named “Honors Professor of the Year” in 1992 and 1996, and was Chair of the Faculty Senate in 1999–2000. He was on the Steering Committee of the International Greek New Testament Project on John (Birmingham, England) and co-editor of Acts of the Apostles in Novum Testamentum Graecum Editio Critica Maior (Institüt für neutestamentliche Textforschung; Münster, Germany) until 2004. He was visiting professor at the American School of Classical Studies in Athens in 1989, at Universität Münster in 2003, and at Claremont School of Theology in 2008. He did archaeological work with Hebrew University of Jerusalem at the Philistine city of Ekron [Tel Miqne] in 1993. In 2004, he published The Text of the Apostolos in Epiphanius of Salamis. Osburn was invited frequently to lecture at universities in Europe, Canada, Africa, and South America. He was a member of Association Internationale d’Études Patristiques and continues membership in Studiorum Novi Testamenti Societas.

In addition to challenging fundamentalists to rethink polemical interpretation of biblical texts,  Osburn also worked to expand boundaries of exclusiveness. He was a pioneer within his religious heritage, tackling difficult issues such as dogmatic sectarianism and gender inequality. In 1993, he published The Peaceable Kingdom: Essays Favoring Non-Sectarian Christianity, and in 2001, Women in the Church: Reclaiming the Ideal. He initiated and hosted the annual Carmichael-Walling Lectures at ACU, which brought renowned scholars from around the world to the campus for stimulating lectures and discussion beyond traditional thinking. His challenges to rethink crucial issues met forceful opposition, but with passing of time, were accepted by increasing numbers of moderates. A festschrift presented to him on his sixty-fifth birthday consists of essays by noted scholars from around the world, some his former students.

Humanitarian career

In 2004, Osburn retired early from academia, became non-denominational, and embraced early Christian emphasis on caring for the poor by becoming executive director of Caris Foundation, Irving, TX, charged with providing basic needs for the underserved. Following construction of medical facilities in Guatemala and Haiti, he concentrated on providing water, food, shelter, clothing, medicine, and education in Africa from 2004 to 2008. A member of Corporate Council on Africa, he was well known for rigorous due diligence, collegiality, and forging alliances among agencies.

In addition to arranging care for hundreds of orphans in Addis Ababa, Ethiopia, he enabled the Fistula Hospital to construct a midwife training college at Desta Minder. In Kenya, he worked with agencies to drill several deep wells to provide pure water, provide care for thousands of orphans, enable women with AIDS to learn skills with which to earn a living, distribute thousands of anti-malarial mosquito nets, provide quality-controlled medications, and assist indigenous humanitarian efforts. He arranged construction of a major facility at Kijabe for an accredited residency program in pediatric orthopedic surgery for African doctors, and funding for hundreds of clubfoot treatments in Kenya and Ethiopia. In Uganda, he arranged funding for hundreds of pediatric orthopedic and neurological surgeries, in northern Democratic Republic of Congo rehabilitation of several medical clinics looted and destroyed during the civil war 1997–2002, and in Rwanda assistance for hundreds of child-headed households. In Zambia, he arranged construction of a major AIDS hospital, TB/AIDS clinics, laboratories, funded hundreds of burn surgeries, and provided an x-ray machine for a rural hospital. In 2008, Osburn was visiting professor in the School of Management, University of St. Andrews, writing on humanitarian issues arising from his work.

Osburn served on the National Committee of Boy Scouts of America from 2005 to 2014. From 2008 to 2015, he served as Advisor with Chiapas International, Dallas, Texas, providing micro-finance for the underserved in Mexico and the Dominican Republic. Since 2016, he serves on the advisory board of Miles of Freedom, a Dallas non-profit facilitating integration of formerly incarcerated persons into society.

Selected works

Books
 
 
  - revised edition of 1994's Women in the Church: refocusing the discussion

as Editor

Articles and Chapters
 
 
 
 
 
 
 
 
 
 
 
 
 
 
 
 
 
 
 
 
 
  - represents a significant revision of the original chapter in the first edition of Ehrman, Bart; Holmes, Michael W. 1995

References 

Living people
Biblical criticism
American biblical scholars
Boy Scouts of America
American humanitarians
New Testament scholars
Scholars of Greek language
20th-century American theologians
20th-century American educators
Year of birth missing (living people)
Harding University alumni